This is a list of finalists for the 2020 Archibald Prize for portraiture (listed is Artist – Title). As the images are copyrighted, an external link to an image has been listed where available.

 - Untitled self-portrait 
 - Self-portrait entering the Archibald 
 - With Tudo and the robe 
 - Madonna (Portrait of Madonna Staunton)
 - My dad, Churchill Cann 
 - The art dealer:  
 - Portrait of Adam Spencer 
 - Self-portrait with Daddy in the daisies, watching the field of planes 
 - Soils for life (Portrait of Charlie Maslin)
 - Tara (Portrait of Tara Badcock)
 - Angela (Portrait of Angela Tiatia)
 - The Irish immigrant – portrait of Claire Dunne  
 - Writing in the sand (Portrait of Dujuan Hoosan)
 - David, Teena and the black dog (Portrait of David Capra)
 - Sleeping beauty (portrait of Michael Reid OAM) 
 - Richard (Portrait of )
 - Disquietude (Portrait of daughter Grace)
 - Annabel, the baker (Portrait of Annabel Crabb)
 - Self-portrait after 'Allegory of Painting 
 - David Marr
 - Barry Jones
 - Adam with bream (Portrait of Adam Liaw)
 - Stan Walker 
 - Brian with pink, blue and yellow (Portrait of Brian Firkus)
 - Liz Laverty 
 - Behrouz Boochani (Winner: People's Choice Award 2020) - Sunshine and Lucky (life) (Portrait of Sunshine Bertrand)
 - JB reading (Portrait of Jennifer Byrne)
 - Salute of gentle frustration (Portrait of Adam Briggs)
 - Matt Kean, NSW Minister for Environment and Energy 
 - Jack Mundey 
 - Stand strong for who you are (Portrait of Adam Goodes) (Winner: Archibald Prize 2020) - Maggie Tabberer 2020 
 - Self-portrait with outstretched arms 
 - Poppy Chicka (Portrait of Charles Madden)
 - Once upon a time in Marrickville – Anthony Albanese 
 - Lucy (Portrait of Lucy Culliton)
 - Dark emu' – portrait of Bruce Pascoe 
 - Phanos at the Yeezy store (Portrait of Phanos Proestos)
 - Dr Raymond Charles Rauscher 
 - Magda Szubanski – comedy and tragedy 
 - Carnation, lily, Yuri, rose (Self-portrait)
 - I'm here (Self-portrait)
 - Alive and brilliant (Portrait of Deborah Conway)
 - L-FRESH the Lion 
 - Ngaiire 
 - Portrait of Will (Portrait of Will Gollins)
,  - Ernest brothers (Self-portraits)
 - Jacinda (Portrait of Jacinda Ardern)
 - Chef's coat – Graeme Doyle 
 - Dolly visits Indulkana (Self-portrait)
 - Requiem (JR) (Portrait of Jack Riley)
 - Meyne (Self-portrait) (Winner: Packing Room Prize 2020)
 - Self-portrait 
 - Tim and kelp (Portrait of Tim Flannery)

See also 
Previous year: List of Archibald Prize 2019 finalists
Next year: List of Archibald Prize 2021 finalists
List of Archibald Prize winners

References

External links
Archibald Prize 2020 Finalists official website

2020
Archibald
Archibald
Archibald Prize 2020
Archibald Prize 2020
Archibald